The U.S. Post Office and Courthouse in Shreveport, Louisiana, was built in 1910.  It was designed in Italian Renaissance architecture style by James K. Taylor and James A. Wetmore. It served historically as a courthouse and as a post office.

In 1974 all federal offices vacated the building. It is currently a branch of the Shreve Memorial Library.

See also 
List of United States post offices
National Register of Historic Places listings in Caddo Parish, Louisiana

References 

Courthouses on the National Register of Historic Places in Louisiana
Post office buildings on the National Register of Historic Places in Louisiana
Government buildings completed in 1910
Buildings and structures in Shreveport, Louisiana
Italian Renaissance Revival architecture in the United States
Post office buildings in Louisiana
Courthouses in Louisiana
National Register of Historic Places in Caddo Parish, Louisiana
Public libraries in Louisiana
Individually listed contributing properties to historic districts on the National Register in Louisiana